This is a list of mammals in Indonesia. It is derived from the IUCN Red List and includes those mammals that have been extinct since 1500.
The following tags are used to highlight each species' conservation status:

Subclass: Yinotheria

Order: Monotremata (monotremes)

Monotremes are mammals that lay eggs instead of giving birth to live young. Momotremata comprises the platypus and echidnas.
Family: Tachyglossidae (echidnas)
Genus: Tachyglossus
 Short-beaked echidna, T. aculeatus 
Genus: Zaglossus
 Sir David's long-beaked echidna, Z. attenboroughi 
 Eastern long-beaked echidna, Z. bartoni  
 Western long-beaked echidna, Z. bruijnii

Subclass Metatheria

Order: Dasyuromorphia (carnivorous marsupials)

The order Dasyuromorphia comprises most of the carnivorous marsupials, including quolls, dunnarts, the numbat, the Tasmanian devil, and the recently extinct thylacine.

Family: Dasyuridae
Genus: Dasyurus
New Guinean quoll, D. albopunctatus
Bronze quoll, D. spartacus
Genus: Micromurexia
Habbema dasyure, Micromurexia habbema
Genus: Murexechinus
Black-tailed dasyure, Murexechinus melanurus
Genus: Murexia
Short-furred dasyure, Murexia longicaudata
Genus: Myoictis
Three-striped dasyure, Myoictis melas
Wallace's dasyure, Myoictis wallacii
Tate's three-striped dasyure, Myoictis wavicus
Genus: Neophascogale
Speckled dasyure,  Neophascogale lorentzi
Genus: Phascolosorex
Red-bellied marsupial shrew, Phascolosorex doriae
Narrow-striped marsupial shrew, Phascolosorex dorsalis
Genus: Phascomurexia
Long-nosed dasyure, Phascomurexia naso
Genus: Planigale
New Guinean planigale, Planigale novaeguineae
Genus: Sminthopsis
Chestnut dunnart, Sminthopsis archeri
Carpentarian dunnart, Sminthopsis butleri
Red-cheeked dunnart, Sminthopsis virginiae

Order: Peramelemorphia (bandicoots and bilbies)

Peramelemorphia includes the bandicoots and bilbies: it equates approximately to the mainstream of marsupial omnivores. All members of the order are endemic to the twin land masses of Australia-New Guinea and most have the characteristic bandicoot shape: a plump, arch-backed body with a long, delicately tapering snout, very large upright ears, relatively long, thin legs, and a thin tail.

Family: Peramelidae (bandicoots)
Genus: Echymipera
Clara's echymipera, E. clara 
Common echymipera, E. kalubu 
Long-nosed echymipera, E. rufescens 
Genus: Isoodon
Northern brown bandicoot, I. macrourus 
Genus: Microperoryctes
Arfak pygmy bandicoot, M. aplini 
Striped bandicoot, M. longicauda 
Mouse bandicoot, M. murina 
Genus: Peroryctes
Raffray's bandicoot, P. raffrayana 
Genus: Rhynchomeles
Seram bandicoot, R. prattorum

Order: Diprotodontia (kangaroos, wallabies, wombats and allies)

Diprotodontia is a large order of about 120 marsupial mammals including the kangaroos, wallabies, possums, koala, wombats, and many others. They are restricted to Australasia.
Family Burramyidae (pygmy possums)
Genus: Cercartetus
Long-tailed pygmy possum, Cercartetus caudatus
Family Phalangeridae
Genus: Ailurops
Talaud bear cuscus, Ailurops melanotis
Sulawesi bear cuscus, Ailurops ursinus
Genus: Phalanger
Gebe cuscus, Phalanger alexandrae
Mountain cuscus, Phalanger carmelitae
Ground cuscus, Phalanger gymnotis
Blue-eyed cuscus, Phalanger matabiru
Southern common cuscus, Phalanger mimicus
Northern common cuscus, Phalanger orientalis
Ornate cuscus, Phalanger ornatus
Rothschild's cuscus, Phalanger rothschildi
Silky cuscus, Phalanger sericeus
Stein's cuscus, Phalanger vestitus
Genus: Spilocuscus
Common spotted cuscus, Spilocuscus maculatus
Waigeou cuscus, Spilocuscus papuensis
Black-spotted cuscus, Spilocuscus rufoniger
Blue-eyed spotted cuscus, Spilocuscus wilsoni
Genus: Strigocuscus
Sulawesi dwarf cuscus, Strigocuscus celebensis
Banggai cuscus, Strigocuscus pelengensis
Family: Petauridae
Genus: Dactylopsila
Great-tailed triok, Dactylopsila megalura
Long-fingered triok, Dactylopsila palpator
Striped possum, Dactylopsila trivirgata
Genus: Petaurus
Biak glider, Petaurus biacensis
Krefft's glider, Petaurus notatus 
Family: Pseudocheiridae
Genus: Pseudochirops
D'Albertis' ringtail possum, Pseudochirops albertisii
Plush-coated ringtail possum, Pseudochirops corinnae
Reclusive ringtail possum, Pseudochirops coronatus
Coppery ringtail possum, Pseudochirops cupreus
Genus: Pseudochirulus
Lowland ringtail possum, Pseudochirulus canescens
Weyland ringtail possum, Pseudochirulus caroli
Masked ringtail possum, Pseudochirulus larvatus
Pygmy ringtail possum, Pseudochirulus mayeri
Vogelkop ringtail possum, Pseudochirulus schlegeli
Family: Acrobatidae
Genus: Distoechurus
Feather-tailed possum, Distoechurus pennatus
Family: Macropodidae
Genus: Dendrolagus
Goodfellow's tree-kangaroo, Dendrolagus goodfellowi
Grizzled tree-kangaroo, Dendrolagus inustus
Dingiso, Dendrolagus mbaiso
Golden-mantled tree-kangaroo, Dendrolagus pulcherrimus
Seri's tree-kangaroo, Dendrolagus stellarum
Ursine tree-kangaroo, Dendrolagus ursinus
Genus: Dorcopsis
White-striped dorcopsis, Dorcopsis hageni
Gray dorcopsis, Dorcopsis luctuosa
Brown dorcopsis, Dorcopsis muelleri
Genus: Dorcopsulus
Small dorcopsis, Dorcopsulus vanheurni
Genus: Macropus
Agile wallaby, Macropus agilis
Genus: Thylogale
Brown's pademelon, Thylogale browni
Dusky pademelon, Thylogale brunii
Red-legged pademelon, Thylogale stigmatica

Subclass Eutheria

Order: Proboscidea (elephants)

The elephants comprise three living species and are the largest living land animals.
Family: Elephantidae
Genus: Elephas
Asian elephant, E. maximus

Order: Sirenia (manatees and dugongs)

Sirenia is an order of fully aquatic, herbivorous mammals that inhabit rivers, estuaries, coastal marine waters, swamps, and marine wetlands. All four species are endangered.
Family Dugongidae
Genus: Dugong
Dugong, D. dugon

Order: Scandentia (treeshrews)

The treeshrews are small mammals native to the tropical forests of Southeast Asia. Although called treeshrews, they are not true shrews and are not all arboreal.
Family Tupaiidae
Genus: Dendrogale
Bornean smooth-tailed treeshrew, D. melanura 
Genus: Tupaia
Golden-bellied treeshrew, T. chrysogaster 
Striped treeshrew, T. dorsalis 
Common treeshrew, T. glis 
Slender treeshrew, T. gracilis 
Horsfield's treeshrew, T. javanica 
Long-footed treeshrew, T. longipes 
Pygmy treeshrew, T. minor 
Painted treeshrew, T. picta 
Ruddy treeshrew, T. splendidula 
Large treeshrew, T. tana 
Family Ptilocercidae
Genus: Ptilocercus
Pen-tailed treeshrew, P. lowii

Order: Dermoptera (colugos)

The two species of colugos make up the order Dermoptera. They are arboreal gliding mammals found in Southeast Asia.
Family Cynocephalidae
Genus: Galeopterus
Sunda flying lemur, G. variegatus

Order: Primates

The order Primates contains humans and their closest relatives: lemurs, lorisoids, monkeys, and apes.
Family Lorisidae
Genus: Nycticebus
Bangka slow loris, N. bancanus
Bornean slow loris, N. borneanus
Sunda slow loris, N. coucang 
Javan slow loris, N. javanicus 
Kayan River slow loris, N. kayan
Philippine slow loris, N. menagensis 
Family Tarsiidae
Genus: Cephalopachus
Horsfield's tarsier, C. bancanus 
Genus: Tarsius
Dian's tarsier, T. dentatus 
Lariang tarsier, T. lariang 
Peleng tarsier, T. pelengensis 
Pygmy tarsier, T. pumilus 
Sangihe tarsier, T. sangirensis 
Spectral tarsier, T. tarsier 
Family Cercopithecidae (Old World monkeys)
Genus: Macaca
Crab-eating macaque, M. fascicularis 
Heck's macaque, M. hecki 
Moor macaque, M. maura 
Southern pig-tailed macaque, M. nemestrina 
Celebes crested macaque, M. nigra 
Gorontalo macaque, M. nigrescens 
Booted macaque, M. ochreata 
Pagai Island macaque, M. pagensis 
Siberut macaque, M. siberu 
Tonkean macaque, M. tonkeana 
Genus: Nasalis
Proboscis monkey, N. larvatus 
Genus: Presbytis
Black-and-white langur, P. bicolor 
Sarawak surili, P. chrysomelas 
Javan surili, P. comata 
Miller's langur, P. canicrus 
White-fronted surili, P. frontata 
Hose's langur, P. hosei 
Black-crested Sumatran langur, P. melalophos 
Mitered langur, P. mitrata 
Natuna Island surili, P. natunae 
East Sumatran banded langur, P. percura 
Mentawai langur, P. potenziani 
Maroon leaf monkey, P. rubicunda 
Saban grizzled langur, P. sabana 
White-thighed surili, P. siamensis 
Siberut langur, P. siberu 
Black Sumatran langur, P. sumatrana 
Thomas's langur, P. thomasi 
Genus: Simias
Pig-tailed langur, S. concolor 
Genus: Trachypithecus
East Javan langur, T. auratus 
Silvery lutung, T. cristatus 
West Javan langur, T. mauritius 
Family Hylobatidae (gibbons)
Genus: Hylobates
Agile gibbon, H. agilis 
Bornean white-bearded gibbon, H. albibarbis 
Kloss's gibbon, H. klossii 
Lar gibbon, H. lar 
Silvery gibbon, H. moloch 
Müller's gibbon, H. muelleri 
Genus: Symphalangus
Siamang, S. syndactylus 
Family Hominidae
Genus: Pongo
Sumatran orangutan, P. abelii 
Bornean orangutan, P. pygmaeus 
Tapanuli orangutan, P. tapanuliensis

Order: Rodentia (rodents)

Rodents make up the largest order of mammals, with over 40% of mammalian species. They have two incisors in the upper and lower jaw which grow continually and must be kept short by gnawing.
Family Hystricidae (Old World porcupines)
Genus: Atherurus
Asiatic brush-tailed porcupine, Atherurus macrourus LC
Genus: Hystrix
Malayan porcupine, H. brachyura 
Thick-spined porcupine, Hystrix crassispinis LC
Sunda porcupine, Hystrix javanica LC
Sumatran porcupine, Hystrix sumatrae LC
Genus: Trichys
Long-tailed porcupine, Trichys fasciculata LC
Family Sciuridae (squirrels)
Genus: Aeromys
Black flying squirrel, Aeromys tephromelas DD
Thomas's flying squirrel, Aeromys thomasi DD
Genus: Callosciurus
Kloss's squirrel, Callosciurus albescensDD
Mentawai squirrel, Callosciurus melanogaster VU
Black-striped squirrel, Callosciurus nigrovittatus NT
Plantain squirrel, Callosciurus notatus LC
Borneo black-banded squirrel, Callosciurus orestes LC
Prevost's squirrel, Callosciurus prevostii LC
Genus: Dremomys
Bornean mountain ground squirrel, Dremomys everetti LC
Genus: Exilisciurus
Least pygmy squirrel, Exilisciurus exilis
Tufted pygmy squirrel, Exilisciurus whiteheadi
Genus: Hylopetes
Bartel's flying squirrel, Hylopetes bartelsi
Gray-cheeked flying squirrel, Hylopetes lepidus
Jentink's flying squirrel, Hylopetes platyurus
Sipora flying squirrel, Hylopetes sipora
Red-cheeked flying squirrel, Hylopetes spadiceus
Sumatran flying squirrel, Hylopetes winstoni
Genus: Hyosciurus
Montane long-nosed squirrel, Hyosciurus heinrichi
Lowland long-nosed squirrel, Hyosciurus ileile
Genus: Iomys
Javanese flying squirrel, Iomys horsfieldii
Mentawi flying squirrel, Iomys sipora
Genus: Lariscus
Three-striped ground squirrel, Lariscus insignis
Niobe ground squirrel, Lariscus niobe
Mentawai three-striped squirrel, Lariscus obscurus
Genus: Petaurista
Spotted giant flying squirrel, Petaurista elegans
Genus: Petinomys
Whiskered flying squirrel, Petinomys genibarbis
Hagen's flying squirrel, Petinomys hageni
Siberut flying squirrel, Petinomys lugens
Arrow flying squirrel, Petinomys sagitta
Temminck's flying squirrel, Petinomys setosus
Vordermann's flying squirrel, Petinomys vordermanni
Genus: Prosciurillus
Secretive dwarf squirrel, Prosciurillus abstrusus
Whitish dwarf squirrel, Prosciurillus leucomus
Celebes dwarf squirrel, Prosciurillus murinus
Sanghir squirrel, Prosciurillus rosenbergii
Weber's dwarf squirrel, Prosciurillus weberi
Genus: Pteromyscus 
Smoky flying squirrel, Pteromyscus pulverulentus
Genus: Ratufa
Cream-coloured giant squirrel, Ratufa affinis
Black giant squirrel, Ratufa bicolor
Genus: Rheithrosciurus
Tufted ground squirrel, Rheithrosciurus macrotis
Genus: Rhinosciurus
Shrew-faced squirrel, Rhinosciurus laticaudatus
Genus: Rubrisciurus
Red-bellied squirrel, Rubrisciurus rubriventer
Genus: Sundasciurus
Brooke's squirrel, Sundasciurus brookei
Fraternal squirrel, Sundasciurus fraterculus
Horse-tailed squirrel, Sundasciurus hippurus
Jentink's squirrel, Sundasciurus jentinki
Low's squirrel, Sundasciurus lowii
Slender squirrel, Sundasciurus tenuis
Family Spalacidae
Genus: Rhizomys
Large bamboo rat, Rhizomys sumatrensis
Family Muridae
Genus: Anisomys
Squirrel-toothed rat, Anisomys imitator
Genus: Baiyankamys
Mountain water rat, Baiyankamys habbema
Genus: Bandicota
Lesser bandicoot rat, Bandicota bengalensis
Greater bandicoot rat, Bandicota indica
Genus: Berylmys
Bower's white-toothed rat, Berylmys bowersi
Genus: Bunomys
Andrew's hill rat, Bunomys andrewsi
Yellow-haired hill rat, Bunomys chrysocomus
Heavenly hill rat, Bunomys coelestis
Fraternal hill rat, Bunomys fratrorum
Inland hill rat, Bunomys penitus
Long-headed hill rat, Bunomys prolatus
Genus: Chiropodomys
Indomalayan pencil-tailed tree mouse, Chiropodomys gliroides
Koopman's pencil-tailed tree mouse, Chiropodomys karlkoopmani
Gray-bellied pencil-tailed tree mouse, Chiropodomys muroides
Small pencil-tailed tree mouse, Chiropodomys pusillus
Genus: Coccymys
White-toothed brush mouse, Coccymys albidens
Rümmler's brush mouse, Coccymys ruemmleri
Genus: Coryphomys
Buhler's coryphomys, Coryphomys buehleri
Genus: Echiothrix
Central Sulawesi echiothrix, Echiothrix centrosa
Northern Sulawesi echiothrix, Echiothrix leucura
Genus: Eropeplus
Sulawesi soft-furred rat, Eropeplus canus
Genus: Haeromys
Ranee mouse, Haeromys margarettae
Minahassa ranee mouse, Haeromys minahassae
Lesser ranee mouse, Haeromys pusillus
Genus: Hydromys
Rakali, Hydromys chrysogaster
Western water rat, Hydromys hussoni
Genus: Hyomys
Western white-eared giant rat, Hyomys dammermani
Genus: Kadarsanomys
Sody's tree rat, Kadarsanomys sodyi
Genus: Komodomys
Komodo rat, Komodomys rintjanus
Genus: Lenomys
Trefoil-toothed giant rat, Lenomys meyeri
Genus: Lenothrix
Gray tree rat, Lenothrix canus
Genus: Leopoldamys
Sundaic mountain leopoldamys, Leopoldamys ciliatus
Diwangkara's long-tailed giant rat, Leopoldamys diwangkarai
Long-tailed giant rat, Leopoldamys sabanus
Mentawai long-tailed giant rat, Leopoldamys siporanus
Genus: Lorentzimys
New Guinean jumping mouse, Lorentzimys nouhuysi
Genus: Mallomys
De Vis's woolly rat, Mallomys aroaensis
Alpine woolly rat, Mallomys gunung
Subalpine woolly rat, Mallomys istapantap
Rothschild's woolly rat, Mallomys rothschildi
Genus: Mammelomys
Large-scaled mosaic-tailed rat, Mammelomys lanosus
Large mosaic-tailed rat, Mammelomys rattoides
Genus: Margaretamys
Beccari's margareta rat, Margaretamys beccarii
Elegant margareta rat, Margaretamys elegans
Little margareta rat, Margaretamys parvus
Christine's margareta rat, Margaretamys christinae
Genus: Maxomys
Bartels's spiny rat, Maxomys bartelsii
Dollman's spiny rat, Maxomys dollmani
Hellwald's spiny rat, Maxomys hellwaldii
Sumatran spiny rat, Maxomys hylomyoides
Musschenbroek's spiny rat, Maxomys musschenbroekii
Fat-nosed spiny rat, Maxomys inflatus
Chestnut-bellied spiny rat, Maxomys ochraceiventer
Pagai spiny rat, Maxomys pagensis
Rajah spiny rat, Maxomys rajah
Red spiny rat, Maxomys surifer
Watts's spiny rat, Maxomys wattsi
Whitehead's spiny rat, Maxomys whiteheadi
Genus: Melasmothrix
Sulawesian shrew rat, Melasmothrix naso
Genus: Melomys
Dusky mosaic-tailed rat, Melomys aerosus
Bannister's rat, Melomys bannisteri
Yamdena mosaic-tailed rat, Melomys cooperae
Manusela mosaic-tailed rat, Melomys fraterculus
Snow Mountains grassland mosaic-tailed rat, Melomys frigicola
Seram long-tailed mosaic-tailed rat, Melomys fulgens
Riama mosaic-tailed rat, Melomys howi
White-bellied mosaic-tailed rat, Melomys leucogaster
Papua grassland mosaic-tailed rat, Melomys lutillus
Obi mosaic-tailed rat, Melomys obiensis
Pavel's Seram mosaic-tailed rat, Melomys paveli
Black-tailed mosaic-tailed rat, Melomys rufescens
Short-tailed Talaud mosaic-tailed rat, Melomys caurinus
Long-tailed Talaud mosaic-tailed rat, Melomys talaudium
Genus: Microhydromys
Northern groove-toothed shrew mouse, Microhydromys richardsoni
Genus: Mus
Ryukyu mouse, Mus caroli
Fawn-colored mouse, Mus cervicolor
Sumatran shrewlike mouse, Mus crociduroides LC
House mouse, M. musculus 
Earth-colored mouse, Mus terricolor
Volcano mouse, Mus vulcani VU
Genus: Nesoromys
Ceram rat, Nesoromys ceramicus EN
Genus: Niviventer
Dark-tailed tree rat, Niviventer cremoriventer
Montane Sumatran white-bellied rat, Niviventer fraternus
Chestnut white-bellied rat, Niviventer fulvescens
Narrow-tailed white-bellied rat, Niviventer lepturus
Long-tailed mountain rat, Niviventer rapit
Genus: Papagomys
Flores giant rat, Papagomys armandvillei
Verhoeven's giant tree rat, Papagomys theodorverhoeveni
Genus: Parahydromys
New Guinea waterside rat, Parahydromys asper
Genus: Paraleptomys, 
Northern water rat, Paraleptomys rufilatus
Short-haired water rat, Paraleptomys wilhelmina
Genus: Paramelomys
Lorentz's mosaic-tailed rat, Paramelomys lorentzii
Thomas's mosaic-tailed rat, Paramelomys mollis
Long-nosed paramelomys, Paramelomys naso
Lowland mosaic-tailed rat, Paramelomys platyops
Mountain mosaic-tailed rat, Paramelomys rubex
Stein's paramelomys, Paramelomys steini
Genus: Paruromys
Sulawesi giant rat, Paruromys dominator
Genus: Paulamys
Flores long-nosed rat, Paulamys naso
Genus: Pithecheir
Red tree rat, Pithecheir melanurus
Genus: Pithecheirops
Bornean pithecheirops, Pithecheirops otion
Genus: Pogonomelomys
Grey pogonomelomys, Pogonomelomys brassi
Lowland brush mouse, Pogonomelomys bruijni
Shaw Mayer's brush mouse, Pogonomelomys mayeri
Genus: Pogonomys
Large tree mouse, Pogonomys loriae
Chestnut tree mouse, Pogonomys macrourus
Gray-bellied tree mouse, Pogonomys sylvestris
Genus: Pseudohydromys
One-toothed shrew mouse, Pseudohydromys ellermani
Western shrew mouse, Pseudohydromys occidentalis VU
Genus: Rattus
Sunburned rat, Rattus adustus DD
Annandale's rat, Rattus annandalei LC
Vogelkop mountain rat, Rattus arfakiensis DD
Ricefield rat, Rattus argentiventer LC
Western New Guinea mountain rat, Rattus arrogans LC
Aceh rat, Rattus blangorum DD
Bonthain rat, Rattus bontanus VU
Sula rat, Rattus elaphinus VU
Enggano rat, Rattus enganus
Polynesian rat, Rattus exulans
Spiny Ceram rat, Rattus feliceus VU
Hainald's rat, Rattus hainaldi EN
Hoffmann's rat, Rattus hoffmanni LC
Hoogerwerf's rat, Rattus hoogerwerfi VU
Japen rat, Rattus jobiensis NT
Koopman's rat, Rattus koopmani NT
Korinch's rat, Rattus korinchi LC
Mentawai rat, Rattus lugens LC
Opossum rat, Rattus marmosurus LC
Little soft-furred rat, Rattus mollicomulus VU
Molaccan prehensile-tailed rat, Rattus morotaiensis LC
Himalayan field rat, Rattus nitidus
Brown rat, R. norvegicus  introduced
Arianus's rat, Rattus omichlodes
Peleng rat, Rattus pelurus
Large New Guinea spiny rat, Rattus praetor LC
Black rat, Rattus rattus
Glacier rat, Rattus richardsoni VU
Southeastern xanthurus rat, Rattus salocco DD
Simalur rat, Rattus simalurensis LC
Stein's rat, Rattus steini LC
Tanezumi rat, Rattus tanezumi LC
Timor rat, Rattus timorensis DD
Malayan field rat, Rattus tiomanicus LC
Slender rat, Rattus verecundus LC
Yellow-tailed rat, Rattus xanthurus LC
Genus: Sommeromys
Sommer's Sulawesi rat, Sommeromys macrorhinos DD
Genus: Spelaeomys
Flores cave rat, Spelaeomys florensis
Genus: Sundamys
Mountain giant Sunda rat, Sundamys infraluteus LC
Bartels's rat, Sundamys maxi EN
Müller's giant Sunda rat, Sundamys muelleri LC
Genus: Taeromys
Salokko rat, Taeromys arcuatus VU
Lovely-haired rat, Taeromys callitrichus LC
Celebes rat, Taeromys celebensis LC
Sulawesi montane rat, Taeromys hamatus VU
Small-eared rat, Taeromys microbullatus DD
Sulawesi forest rat, Taeromys punicans NT
Tondano rat, Taeromys taerae LC
Genus: Tateomys
Long-tailed shrew rat, Tateomys macrocercus VU
Tate's shrew rat, Tateomys rhinogradoides DD
Genus: Uromys
Giant naked-tailed rat, Uromys anak LC
Biak giant rat, Uromys boeadii CR
Giant white-tailed rat, Uromys caudimaculatus LC
Emma's giant rat, Uromys emmae CR
Great Key Island giant rat, Uromys siebersi DD
Genus: Xenuromys
Mimic tree rat, Xenuromys barbatus NT

Order: Lagomorpha (lagomorphs)

The lagomorphs comprise two families, Leporidae (hares and rabbits), and Ochotonidae (pikas). Though they can resemble rodents, and were classified as a superfamily in that order until the early 20th century, they have since been considered a separate order. They differ from rodents in a number of physical characteristics, such as having four incisors in the upper jaw rather than two.
Family Leporidae
Genus: Lepus
Indian hare, L. nigricollis  possibly introduced
Genus: Nesolagus
Sumatran striped rabbit, Nesolagus netscheri

Order Eulipotyphla (shrews, moles, and hedgehogs)

The "shrew-forms" are insectivorous mammals. The shrews and solenodons closely resemble mice while the moles are stout-bodied burrowers. The hedgehogs are easily recognised by their spines while gymnures look more like large rats.
Family: Erinaceidae
Genus: Echinosorex
Moonrat, Echinosorex gymnura
Genus: Hylomys
Dwarf gymnure, Hylomys parvus
Short-tailed gymnure, Hylomys suillus
Family: Soricidae (shrews)
Genus: Chimarrogale
Bornean water shrew, Chimarrogale phaeura
Sumatran water shrew, Chimarrogale sumatrana
Genus: Crocidura
Kinabalu shrew, Crocidura baluensis
Batak shrew, Crocidura batakorum
Beccari's shrew, Crocidura beccarii
Thick-tailed shrew, Crocidura brunnea
Elongated shrew, Crocidura elongata
Bornean shrew, Crocidura foetida
Hill's shrew, Crocidura hilliana
Hutan shrew, Crocidura hutanis
Jenkins' shrew, Crocidura jenkinsi
Sulawesi shrew, Crocidura lea
Sumatran giant shrew, Crocidura lepidura
Sulawesi tiny shrew, Crocidura levicula
Malayan shrew, Crocidura malayana
Javanese shrew, Crocidura maxi
Sunda shrew, Crocidura monticola
Mossy forest shrew, Crocidura musseri
Peninsular shrew, Crocidura negligens
Black-footed shrew, Crocidura nigripes
Oriental shrew, Crocidura orientalis
Sumatran long-tailed shrew, Crocidura paradoxura
Crocidura phanluongi
Sulawesi white-handed shrew, Crocidura rhoditis
Timor shrew, Crocidura tenuis
Banka shrew, Crocidura vosmaeri
Genus: Suncus
Flores shrew, Suncus mertensi
Asian house shrew, S. murinus

Order: Chiroptera (bats)

The bats' most distinguishing feature is that their forelimbs are developed as wings, making them the only mammals capable of flight. Bat species account for about 20% of all mammals.
Family: Pteropodidae (megabats)
Genus: Acerodon
Sulawesi flying fox, Acerodon celebensis LC
Talaud flying fox, Acerodon humilis EN
Sunda flying fox, Acerodon mackloti VU
Genus: Aethalops
Borneo fruit bat, Aethalops aequalis LC
Pygmy fruit bat, Aethalops alecto LC
Genus: Aproteles
Bulmer's fruit bat, Aproteles bulmerae CR
Genus: Balionycteris
Spotted-winged fruit bat, Balionycteris maculata LC
Genus: Chironax
Black-capped fruit bat, Chironax melanocephalus LC
Genus: Cynopterus
Lesser short-nosed fruit bat, C. brachyotis 
Horsfield's fruit bat, Cynopterus horsfieldi LC
Peters's fruit bat, Cynopterus luzoniensis LC
Minute fruit bat, Cynopterus minutus LC
Nusatenggara short-nosed fruit bat, Cynopterus nusatenggara LC
Greater short-nosed fruit bat, Cynopterus sphinx LC
Indonesian short-nosed fruit bat, Cynopterus titthaecheileus LC
Genus: Dobsonia
Beaufort's naked-backed fruit bat, Dobsonia beauforti LC
Halmahera naked-backed fruit bat, Dobsonia crenulata LC
Biak naked-backed fruit bat, Dobsonia emersa VU
Sulawesi naked-backed fruit bat, Dobsonia exoleta LC
Lesser naked-backed fruit bat, Dobsonia minor LC
Moluccan naked-backed fruit bat, Dobsonia moluccensis LC
Western naked-backed fruit bat, Dobsonia peronii LC
Greenish naked-backed fruit bat, Dobsonia viridis LC
Genus: Dyacopterus
Brooks's dyak fruit bat, Dyacopterus brooksi VU
Rickart's dyak fruit bat, Dyacopterus rickarti
Dayak fruit bat, Dyacopterus spadiceus NT
Genus: Eonycteris
Greater nectar bat, Eonycteris major DD
Cave nectar bat, Eonycteris spelaea LC
Genus: Harpyionycteris
Sulawesi harpy fruit bat, Harpyionycteris celebensis VU
Genus: Macroglossus
Long-tongued nectar bat, Macroglossus minimus LC
Long-tongued fruit bat, Macroglossus sobrinus LC
Genus: Megaerops
Tailless fruit bat, Megaerops ecaudatus LC
Javan tailless fruit bat, Megaerops kusnotoi VU
White-collared fruit bat, Megaerops wetmorei VU
Genus: Neopteryx
Small-toothed fruit bat, Neopteryx frosti EN
Genus: Nyctimene
Broad-striped tube-nosed fruit bat, Nyctimene aello NT
Common tube-nosed fruit bat, Nyctimene albiventer LC
Dark tube-nosed fruit bat, Nyctimene celaeno VU
Pallas's tube-nosed bat, Nyctimene cephalotes LC
Mountain tube-nosed fruit bat, Nyctimene certans NT
Round-eared tube-nosed fruit bat, Nyctimene cyclotis DD
Dragon tube-nosed fruit bat, Nyctimene draconilla VU
Keast's tube-nosed fruit bat, Nyctimene keasti VU
Lesser tube-nosed bat, Nyctimene minutus VU
Genus: Paranyctimene
Lesser tube-nosed fruit bat, Paranyctimene raptor LC
Steadfast tube-nosed fruit bat, Paranyctimene tenax
Genus: Penthetor
Dusky fruit bat, Penthetor lucasi LC
Genus: Pteropus
Black flying fox, Pteropus alecto LC
Silvery flying fox, Pteropus argentatus
Aru flying fox, Pteropus aruensis
Ashy-headed flying fox, Pteropus caniceps
Moluccan flying fox, Pteropus chrysoproctus
Spectacled flying fox, Pteropus conspicillatus
Gray flying fox, Pteropus griseus
Small flying fox, Pteropus hypomelanus
Kei flying fox, Pteropus keyensis
Lombok flying fox, Pteropus lombocensis
Big-eared flying fox, Pteropus macrotis
Black-bearded flying fox, Pteropus melanopogon
Black-eared flying fox, Pteropus melanotus
Great flying fox, Pteropus neohibernicus
Ceram fruit bat, Pteropus ocularis
Masked flying fox, Pteropus personatus
Geelvink Bay flying fox, Pteropus pohlei
Philippine gray flying fox, Pteropus speciosus
Temminck's flying fox, Pteropus temmincki
Large flying fox, Pteropus vampyrus
Genus: Rousettus
Geoffroy's rousette, Rousettus amplexicaudatus
Manado fruit bat, Rousettus bidens
Sulawesi rousette, Rousettus celebensis
Leschenault's rousette, Rousettus leschenaulti
Linduan rousette, Rousettus linduensis
Bare-backed rousette, Rousettus spinalatus
Genus: Styloctenium
Sulawesi stripe-faced fruit batStyloctenium wallacei
Genus: Syconycteris
Common blossom bat, Syconycteris australis
Halmahera blossom bat, Syconycteris carolinae
Moss-forest blossom bat, Syconycteris hobbit
Genus: Thoopterus
Swift fruit bat, Thoopterus nigrescens
Family Rhinopomatidae
Genus: Rhinopoma
Greater mouse-tailed bat, Rhinopoma microphyllum
Family Megadermatidae (false vampire bats)
Genus: Megaderma
Lesser false vampire bat, Megaderma spasma
Family Rhinolophidae (horseshoe bats)
Genus: Rhinolophus
Acuminate horseshoe bat, Rhinolophus acuminatus
Intermediate horseshoe bat, Rhinolophus affinis
Arcuate horseshoe bat, Rhinolophus arcuatus
Bornean horseshoe bat, Rhinolophus borneensis
Canut's horseshoe bat, Rhinolophus canuti
Sulawesi horseshoe bat, Rhinolophus celebensis
Creagh's horseshoe bat, Rhinolophus creaghi
Broad-eared horseshoe bat, Rhinolophus euryotis
Insular horseshoe bat, Rhinolophus keyensis
Blyth's horseshoe bat, Rhinolophus lepidus
Woolly horseshoe bat, Rhinolophus luctus
Big-eared horseshoe bat, Rhinolophus macrotis
Madura horseshoe bat, Rhinolophus madurensis
Smaller horseshoe bat, Rhinolophus megaphyllus
Neriad horseshoe bat, Rhinolophus nereis NT
Large-eared horseshoe bat, Rhinolophus philippinensis NT
Least horseshoe bat, Rhinolophus pusillus LC
Lesser woolly horseshoe bat, Rhinolophus sedulus
Lesser brown horseshoe bat, Rhinolophus stheno LC
Trefoil horseshoe bat, Rhinolophus trifoliatus LC
Family Hipposideridae
Genus: Aselliscus
Temminck's trident bat, Aselliscus tricuspidatus LC
Genus: Coelops
East Asian tailless leaf-nosed bat, Coelops frithii LC
Malayan tailless leaf-nosed bat, Coelops robinsoni VU
Genus: Hipposideros
Dusky roundleaf bat, Hipposideros ater LC
Bicolored roundleaf bat, Hipposideros bicolor LC
Short-headed roundleaf bat, Hipposideros breviceps VU
Spurred roundleaf bat, Hipposideros calcaratus LC
Fawn leaf-nosed bat, Hipposideros cervinus LC
Ashy roundleaf bat, Hipposideros cineraceus LC
Telefomin roundleaf bat, Hipposideros corynophyllus VU
Timor roundleaf bat, Hipposideros crumeniferus DD
Diadem leaf-nosed bat, Hipposideros diadema LC
Borneo roundleaf bat, Hipposideros doriae NT
Dayak roundleaf bat, Hipposideros dyacorum LC
Cantor's roundleaf bat, Hipposideros galeritus LC
Crested roundleaf bat, Hipposideros inexpectatus
Intermediate roundleaf bat, Hipposideros larvatus LC
Big-eared roundleaf bat, Hipposideros macrobullatus
Maduran leaf-nosed bat, Hipposideros madurae
Maggie Taylor's roundleaf bat, Hipposideros maggietaylorae
Fly River roundleaf bat, Hipposideros muscinus
Orbiculus leaf-nosed bat, Hipposideros orbiculus
Biak roundleaf bat, Hipposideros papua
Peleng leaf-nosed bat, Hipposideros pelingensis
Sorensen's leaf-nosed bat, Hipposideros sorenseni
Sumba roundleaf bat, Hipposideros sumbae
Wollaston's roundleaf bat, Hipposideros wollastoni
Family Emballonuridae (sac-winged bats)
Genus: Emballonura
Small Asian sheath-tailed bat, Emballonura alecto
Beccari's sheath-tailed bat, Emballonura beccarii
Greater sheath-tailed bat, Emballonura furax
Lesser sheath-tailed bat, Emballonura monticola
Raffray's sheath-tailed bat, Emballonura raffrayana
Genus: Mosia
Dark sheath-tailed bat, Mosia nigrescens
Genus: Saccolaimus
Naked-rumped pouched bat, Saccolaimus saccolaimus
Genus: Taphozous
Indonesian tomb bat, Taphozous achates
Long-winged tomb bat, Taphozous longimanus
Black-bearded tomb bat, Taphozous melanopogon
Theobald's tomb bat, Taphozous theobaldi
Family: Nycteridae (slit-faced bats)
Genus: Nycteris
Javan slit-faced bat, Nycteris javanica
Malayan slit-faced bat, Nycteris tragata
Family: Molossidae (free-tailed bats)
Genus: Chaerephon
Northern freetail bat, Chaerephon jobensis
Northern free-tailed bat, Chaerephon johorensis
Genus: Cheiromeles
Lesser naked bat, Cheiromeles parvidens
Hairless bat, Cheiromeles torquatus
Genus: Mops
Malayan free-tailed bat, Mops mops
Sulawesi free-tailed bat, Mops sarasinorum
Genus: Mormopterus
Beccari's free-tailed bat, Mormopterus beccarii
Sumatran mastiff bat, Mormopterus doriae
Genus: Otomops
Javan mastiff bat, Otomops formosus
Johnstone's mastiff bat, Otomops johnstonei
Family Vespertilionidae (vesper bats)
Genus: Arielulus
Black-gilded pipistrelle, Arielulus circumdatus
Coppery pipistrelle, Arielulus cuprosus
Genus: Falsistrellus
Pungent pipistrelle, Falsistrellus mordax
Peters's pipistrelle, Falsistrellus petersi
Genus: Glischropus
Javan thick-thumbed bat, Glischropus javanus
Common thick-thumbed bat, Glischropus tylopus
Genus: Harpiocephalus
Lesser hairy-winged bat, Harpiocephalus harpia
Greater hairy-winged bat, Harpiocephalus mordax
Genus: Hesperoptenus
Blanford's bat, Hesperoptenus blanfordi
False serotine bat, Hesperoptenus doriae
Gaskell's false serotine, Hesperoptenus gaskelli
Large false serotine, Hesperoptenus tomesi
Genus: Hypsugo
Brown pipistrelle, Hypsugo imbricatus
Red-brown pipistrelle, Hypsugo kitcheneri
Big-eared pipistrelle, Hypsugo macrotis
Vordermann's pipistrelle, Hypsugo vordermanni
Genus: Kerivoula
Flores woolly bat, Kerivoula flora
Hardwicke's woolly bat, Kerivoula hardwickii
Small woolly bat, Kerivoula intermedia
Papillose woolly bat, Kerivoula papillosa
Clear-winged woolly bat, Kerivoula pellucida
Painted bat, Kerivoula picta
Whitehead's woolly bat, Kerivoula whiteheadi
Genus: Miniopterus
Little bent-wing bat, Miniopterus australis
Miniopterus macrocneme
Western bent-winged bat, Miniopterus magnater
Intermediate long-fingered bat, Miniopterus medius
Philippine long-fingered bat, Miniopterus paululus
Small bent-winged bat, Miniopterus pusillus
Common bent-wing bat, M. schreibersii 
Shortridges's long-fingered bat, Miniopterus shortridgei
Great bent-winged bat, Miniopterus tristis
Genus: Murina
Bronze tube-nosed bat, Murina aenea
Round-eared tube-nosed bat, Murina cyclotis
Flute-nosed bat, Murina florium
Gilded tube-nosed bat, Murina rozendaali
Brown tube-nosed bat, Murina suilla
Genus: Myotis
Large-footed bat, Myotis adversus
Peters's myotis, Myotis ater
Hodgson's bat, M. formosus 
Lesser large-footed bat, Myotis hasseltii
Herman's myotis, Myotis hermani
Horsfield's bat, Myotis horsfieldii
Pallid large-footed myotis, Myotis macrotarsus
Maluku myotis, Myotis moluccarum
Burmese whiskered bat, Myotis montivagus
Wall-roosting mouse-eared bat, Myotis muricola
Ridley's bat, Myotis ridleyi
Himalayan whiskered bat, Myotis siligorensis
Kei myotis, Myotis stalkeri
Genus: Nyctophilus
Sunda long-eared bat, Nyctophilus heran
Greater long-eared bat, Nyctophilus timoriensis
Genus: Philetor
Rohu's bat, Philetor brachypterus
Genus: Phoniscus
Groove-toothed bat, Phoniscus atrox
Peters's trumpet-eared bat, Phoniscus jagorii
Golden-tipped bat, Phoniscus papuensis
Genus: Pipistrellus
Angulate pipistrelle, Pipistrellus angulatus
Kelaart's pipistrelle, Pipistrellus ceylonicus
Java pipistrelle, Pipistrellus javanicus
Minahassa pipistrelle, Pipistrellus minahassae
Lesser Papuan pipistrelle, Pipistrellus papuanus
Narrow-winged pipistrelle, Pipistrellus stenopterus
Least pipistrelle, Pipistrellus tenuis
Genus: Scotophilus
Sulawesi yellow bat, Scotophilus celebensis
Sody's yellow house bat, Scotophilus collinus
Lesser Asiatic yellow bat, Scotophilus kuhlii
Genus: Scotorepens
Northern broad-nosed bat, Scotorepens sanborni
Genus: Tylonycteris
Lesser bamboo bat, Tylonycteris pachypus
Greater bamboo bat, Tylonycteris robustula

Order Pholidota (pangolins)

The order Pholidota comprises the eight species of pangolin. Pangolins are anteaters and have the powerful claws, elongated snout and long tongue seen in the other unrelated anteater species.
Family Manidae
Genus: Manis
Sunda pangolin, M. javanica

Order: Cetacea (whales)

The order Cetacea includes whales, dolphins and porpoises. They are the mammals most fully adapted to aquatic life with a spindle-shaped nearly hairless body, protected by a thick layer of blubber, and forelimbs and tail modified to provide propulsion underwater.
Family: Balaenopteridae (rorquals)
Genus: Balaenoptera
Common minke whale, Balaenoptera acutorostrata LC
Antarctic minke whale, Balaenoptera bonaerensis DD
Sei whale, Balaenoptera borealis EN
Bryde's whale, Balaenoptera brydei DD
Eden's whale, Balaenoptera edeni DD
Blue whale, Balaenoptera musculus EN
Fin whale, Balaenoptera physalus EN
Omura's whale, Balaenoptera omurai DD
Genus: Megaptera
Humpback whale, Megaptera novaeangliae LC
Family Physeteridae (sperm whales)
Genus: Physeter
Sperm whale, Physeter macrocephalus VU
Family: Kogiidae (small sperm whales)
Genus: Kogia
Pygmy sperm whale, K. breviceps 
Dwarf sperm whale, Kogia sima DD
Family: Phocoenidae (porpoises)
Genus: Neophocaena
Finless porpoise, Neophocaena phocaenoides VU
Family Ziphiidae (beaked whales)
Genus: Mesoplodon
Blainville's beaked whale, Mesoplodon densirostris DD
Ginkgo-toothed beaked whale, Mesoplodon ginkgodens DD
Genus: Ziphius
Cuvier's beaked whaleZiphius cavirostris LC
Family: Delphinidae (oceanic dolphins)
Genus: Delphinus
Long-beaked common dolphin, Delphinus capensis DD
Genus: Feresa
Pygmy killer whale, Feresa attenuata DD
Genus: Globicephala
Short-finned pilot whale, Globicephala macrorhynchus DD
Genus: Grampus
Risso's dolphin, Grampus griseus LC
Genus: Lagenodelphis
Fraser's dolphin, Lagenodelphis hosei LC
Genus: Orcaella
Irrawaddy dolphin, O. brevirostris 
Australian snubfin dolphin, Orcaella heinsohni NT
Genus: Orcinus
Orca, O. orca 
Genus: Peponocephala
Melon-headed whale, Peponocephala electra LC
Genus: Pseudorca
False killer whale, Pseudorca crassidens DD
Genus: Sousa
Chinese white dolphin, Sousa chinensis NT
Genus: Stenella
Pantropical spotted dolphin, Stenella attenuata LC
Striped dolphin, Stenella coeruleoalba LC
Spinner dolphin, Stenella longirostris DD
Genus: Steno
Rough-toothed dolphin, Steno bredanensis LC
Genus: Tursiops
Indo-Pacific bottlenose dolphin, Tursiops aduncus DD
Common bottlenose dolphin, Tursiops truncatus LC

Order: Carnivora (carnivorans)

There are over 260 species of carnivorans, the majority of which feed primarily on meat. They have a characteristic skull shape and dentition.
Family Felidae (cats)
Genus: Catopuma
Bay cat, C. badia 
Asian golden cat, C. temminckii 
Genus: Neofelis
Sunda clouded leopard, N. diardi 
Genus: Panthera
Leopard, P. pardus 
Javan leopard, P. p. melas 
Tiger, P. tigris 
Bali tiger, P. t. sondaica 
Javan tiger, P. t. sondaica 
Sumatran tiger, P. t. sondaica 
Genus: Pardofelis
Marbled cat, P. marmorata 
Genus: Prionailurus
Sunda leopard cat, P. javanensis
Flat-headed cat, P. planiceps 
Fishing cat, P. viverrinus  presence uncertain
Family Viverridae (civets)
Genus: Arctictis
Binturong, A. binturong 
Genus: Arctogalidia
Small-toothed palm civet, A. trivirgata 
Genus: Cynogale
Otter civet, C. bennettii 
Genus: Hemigalus
Banded palm civet, H. derbyanus 
Genus: Macrogalidia
Sulawesi palm civet, M. musschenbroekii 
Genus: Paguma
Masked palm civet, P. larvata 
Genus: Paradoxurus
Asian palm civet, P. hermaphroditus  
Genus: Viverra
Malayan civet, V. tangalunga 
Genus: Viverricula 
Small Indian civet, V. indica 
Family Prionodontidae (linsangs)
Genus: Prionodon
Banded linsang, P. linsang 
Family Herpestidae (mongooses)
Genus: Urva
Short-tailed mongoose, U. brachyura 
Javan mongoose, U. javanica  
Collared mongoose, U. semitorquata 
Family Ursidae (bears)
Genus: Helarctos
Sun bear, H. malayanus 
Family Canidae (Canids)
Genus: Cuon
Dhole, C. alpinus  
Family: Mustelidae (weasels)
Genus: Aonyx
Asian small-clawed otter, A. cinereus 
Genus: Arctonyx
Sumatran hog badger, A. hoevenii 
Genus: Lutra
Eurasian otter, L. lutra 
Hairy-nosed otter, L. sumatrana 
Genus: Lutrogale
Smooth-coated otter, L. perspicillata 
Genus: Martes
Yellow-throated marten, M. flavigula 
Genus: Melogale
Bornean ferret-badger, M. everetti 
Javan ferret-badger, M. orientalis 
Genus: Mustela
Indonesian mountain weasel, M. lutreolina 
Malayan weasel, M. nudipes 
Family Mephitidae (skunks)
Genus: Mydaus
Sunda stink badger, M. javanensis

Order: Perissodactyla (odd-toed ungulates)

The odd-toed ungulates are browsing and grazing mammals. They are usually large to very large, and have relatively simple stomachs and a large middle toe.
Family Rhinocerotidae (rhinoceroses)
Genus: Dicerorhinus
Sumatran rhinoceros, D. sumatrensis 
Genus: Rhinoceros
Javan rhinoceros, R. sondaicus 
Family Tapiridae (tapirs)
Genus: Acrocodia
Malayan tapir, A. indicus

Order: Artiodactyla (even-toed ungulates)

The even-toed ungulates are ungulates whose weight is borne about equally by the third and fourth toes, rather than mostly or entirely by the third as in perissodactyls. There are about 220 artiodactyl species, including many that are of great economic importance to humans.
Family Suidae (pigs)
Genus: Babyrousa
Buru babirusa, B. babyrussa 
Bola Batu babirusa, B. bolabatuensis 
North Sulawesi babirusa, B. celebensis 
Togian babirusa, B. togeanensis 
Genus: Sus
Bornean bearded pig, S. barbatus 
Celebes warty pig, S. celebensis 
Wild boar, S. scrofa 
Javan warty pig, S. verrucosus 
Family Tragulidae (mouse deer)
Genus: Tragulus
Java mouse-deer, T. javanicus 
Lesser mouse-deer, T. kanchil 
Greater mouse-deer, T. napu 
Family Bovidae (Bovids)
Genus: Bos
Banteng, B. javanicus 
Genus: Bubalus
Lowland anoa, B. depressicornis 
Mountain anoa, B. quarlesi 
Genus: Capricornis
Mainland serow, C. sumatraensis 
Family Cervidae (deer)
Genus: Axis
Bawean deer, A. kuhlii 
Genus: Muntiacus
Bornean yellow muntjac, M. atherodes 
Sumatran muntjac, M. montanus 
Indian muntjac, M. muntjak 
Genus: Rusa
Rusa deer, R. timorensis 
Sambar deer, R. unicolor

Locally extinct 
The following taxa are locally extinct in the country:
Wild water buffalo, Bubalus arnee
Bali tiger and Javan tiger, both Panthera tigris sondaica populations

References

 
Mammals
Indonesia
 Indonesia
Indonesia